This is a list of climate change topics.

0-9
100% renewable energy -
100,000-year problem  -  
1500-Year climate cycle  - 
4 Degrees and Beyond International Climate Conference

A
Abrupt climate change -
The Age of Stupid -
Albedo -
An Inconvenient Truth -
An Inconvenient Book -
Antarctica cooling controversy -
Antarctic Bottom Water -
Antarctic Cold Reversal -
Antarctic oscillation -
Anthropocene extinction -
Arctic amplification -
Arctic Climate Impact Assessment -
Arctic geoengineering -
Arctic shrinkage -
Arctic oscillation -
Atlantic oscillation -
Arctic Climate Impact Assessment -
Arctic methane release -
Arctic sea ice decline -
Arctic shrinkage -
Argo (oceanography) -
ARkStorm -
Athabasca oil sands -
Atlantic Multidecadal Oscillation -
Atmospheric circulation -
Atmospheric sciences -
Atmospheric window -
Attribution of recent climate change -
Aviation and climate change -
Aviation and the environment - 
Avoiding dangerous climate change

B
Bali Communiqué -
Bali Road Map -
Bezos Earth Fund -
Biochar -
Bioenergy with carbon capture and storage -
Bio-geoengineering -
Black carbon -
Blytt–Sernander system -
Broad spectrum revolution -
Business action on climate change

C
Callendar effect -
Cap and Share -
Carbon bubble -
Carbon capture and storage -
Carbon cycle -
Carbon negative -
Carbon neutral -
Carbon price -
Carbon project -
Carbon sequestration -
Carbon offset -
Carbon sink -
Carbon tax -
Catastrophic climate change -
Center for the Study of Carbon Dioxide and Global Change -
Clathrate gun hypothesis -
Clean coal technology -
Clean Energy Trends -
Climate -
Climate change -
Climate change acronyms -
Climate Change Act 2008 -
Climate change denial -
Climate change feedback -
Climate change in Japan -
Climate change in popular culture -
Climate change mitigation -
Climate change mitigation -
Climate change mitigation scenarios -
Climate Code Red (book) -
Climate commitment -
Climate communication -
Climate crisis -
Climate crunch -
Climate cycle -
Climate emergency declaration -
Climate engineering -
Climate ethics -
Climate governance-
Climate Investment Funds -
Climate model -
Climate refugee -
Climate risk management -
Climate scientists (list) -
Climate sensitivity -
Climate spiral -
Climate stabilization wedge -
Climate surprise -
Climate system -
Climate variability -
Climate Vulnerable Forum -
Climatic Research Unit email controversy -
Cloud feedback -
Cloud reflectivity enhancement -
Coal phase out -
Contraction and Convergence -
Contrail -
Cool roof -
Cool tropics paradox -
Coral bleaching

D
The Day After Tomorrow -
Dendroclimatology -
Divergence problem -
Drought -
Drought in the United States

E
Early anthropocene -
Earth Hour -
Earth's atmosphere -
Earth's energy budget -
EarthLab -
Earthshine -
East Antarctic Ice Sheet -
Eco-efficiency -
Ecological Forecasting -
Ecotax -
Effects of climate change on agriculture -
Effect of climate change on plant biodiversity -
Effects of climate change on marine mammals -
Effects of climate change on oceans -
Effects of climate change - 
Effects of climate change on Australia - 
Effects of climate change on India -
Efficient energy use -
El Niño (ENSO) -
Emission inventory -
Emission Reduction Unit -
Emission standards -
Emissions trading -
Energie-Cités -
Energy Autonomy -
Energy conservation -
Energy forestry -
Energy poverty -
Enteric fermentation -
Environmental crime -
Environmental impact of aviation -
Environmental skepticism -
European Climate Forum -
Evidence of global warming - 
Externality

F
Fossil fuel -
Fossil fuel divestment -
Fossil fuel phase out -
Fossil fuel power plant -
Freon -
Food security

G
G8+5 -
Geoengineering -
GFDL CM2.X -
Glacial period -
Global Change Master Directory -
Global climate model -
Global cooling -
Global climate model (General Circulation Model) -
Global dimming -
Global warming -
Global warming controversy -
Global warming hiatus -
Global warming period -
Global warming potential -
Greenhouse and icehouse Earth -
Greenhouse gas emissions from agriculture -
Greenhouse debt -
Greenhouse effect -
Greenhouse gas -
Greenhouse gas accounting -
Greenhouse gas inventory -
Gulf Stream

H
Heiligendamm Process -
Hell and High Water -
History of climate change science -
Hockey stick graph -
Holocene -
Holocene Climatic Optimum -
Holocene extinction -
Homogenization -
How Global Warming Works -
Hydraulic fracturing -
Hydrological geoengineering -
Hypermobile travellers

I
Ice age -
Ice core -
Ice sheet dynamics -
Individual and political action on climate change -
Insolation -
Instrumental temperature record -
Interdecadal Pacific Oscillation -
Intergovernmental Panel on Climate Change -
International Conference on Climate Change -
IPCC list of greenhouse gases

K
Keeling Curve -
Kyoto Protocol

L
Laudato si -
List of climate scientists - 
List of geoengineering topics -
List of ministers of climate change -
List of proposed geoengineering projects -
List of scientists opposing the mainstream scientific assessment of global warming -
Little Ice Age -
Long-term effects of global warming - 
Low-carbon emissions

M
Magnetosphere -
Maunder Minimum -
Mauna Loa -
Media coverage of climate change-
Medieval Warm Period -
Meridional overturning circulation -
Meteorology -
Methane -
Methane clathrate -
Milankovitch cycles - 
Molecular-scale temperature

N
Nitrous oxide (N2O) -
North Atlantic Deep Water -
North Atlantic oscillation -
Northwest Passage

O
Ocean acidification - 
Ocean anoxia - 
Older Dryas -
Oldest Dryas -
Overpopulation -
Ozone depletion

P
Pacific decadal oscillation -
Paleocene–Eocene Thermal Maximum -
Paleoclimate Modelling Intercomparison Project -
Paleothermometer -
Parameterization -
Planetary engineering -
Peak oil -
Phenology -
Physical impacts of climate change -
Polar amplification -
Proxy

Q
Quaternary glaciation - 
Quasi-biennial oscillation

R
Radiative forcing -
Renewable energy -
Renewable energy commercialization -
Retreat of glaciers since 1850 -
Runaway climate change

S
Sahara pump theory -
Satellite temperature measurements -
Scientific opinion on climate change -
Scientific consensus -
Scientific skepticism -
Sea level rise -
Shutdown of thermohaline circulation - 
Sixth extinction -
Slash and burn -
Snowball Earth -
Solar Radiation Management -
Solar shade -
Solar variation -
Space sunshade -
Stratospheric Particle Injection for Climate Engineering -
Stratospheric sulfur aerosols -
Stratospheric sulfur aerosols (geoengineering) -
Sunspot -
Surveys of scientists' views on climate change -
Sustainable energy

T
Table of Historic and Prehistoric Climate Indicators -
Temperature record of the past 1000 years -
Temperature record since 1880 -
Thermohaline circulation -
Timeline of glaciation -
TEX-86 -
Thermocline -
The Deniers -
The Great Global Warming Swindle -
The Republican War on Science -
Timeline of environmental history -
Tipping point (climatology)

U
Urban heat island -
UN climate change conference 2009 -
The Uninhabitable Earth

W
Warming stripes -
Waste heat -
Water World -
West Antarctic Ice Sheet -
World climate research programme -
World Climate Report

Y
Yamal Peninsula

See also

 Glossary of climate change
 Scientific opinion on climate change
 List of countries by greenhouse gas emissions per capita
 List of countries by carbon dioxide emissions per capita
 List of countries by carbon dioxide emissions
 :Category:Climate change 
 :Category:Climate change by country
 :Category:Climatology

External links
 IPCC - glossary

Climate change